Barriers of the Law is a 1925 American silent crime film directed by J.P. McGowan and starring McGowan, Helen Holmes and William Desmond.

Synopsis
Rita Wingate a former bootlegger changes side with law enforcement official Rex Brandon against her former boss, gang leader Steve Redding. Redding now sets out to silence her from providing evidence against her.

Cast
 J.P. McGowan as 	Steve Redding
 Helen Holmes as 	Rita Wingate
 William Desmond as Rex Brandon
 Albert J. Smith as Aide to Redding
 Norma Wills as Annie
 Marguerite Clayton as Leila Larkin

References

Bibliography
 Connelly, Robert B. The Silents: Silent Feature Films, 1910-36, Volume 40, Issue 2. December Press, 1998.
 Munden, Kenneth White. The American Film Institute Catalog of Motion Pictures Produced in the United States, Part 1. University of California Press, 1997.

External links
 

1925 films
1925 crime films
American silent feature films
American crime films
American black-and-white films
Films directed by J. P. McGowan
1920s English-language films
1920s American films